Neuroendocrinology Letters (sometimes formatted Neuro-endocrinology Letters) is an international peer-reviewed medical journal covering neuroendocrinology. It was established in 1979 and is published eight times per year by Maghira & Maas Publications. The editor-in-chief is Peter G. Fedor-Freybergh (St. Elisabeth University). According to the Journal Citation Reports, the journal has a 2016 impact factor of 0.918.

References

External links
 

Neuroendocrinology
Neurology journals
Endocrinology journals
Publications established in 1979
English-language journals
8 times per year journals
Academic journals published in Sweden